Westmount–Saint-Georges was a former provincial electoral district in the Montreal region of Quebec, Canada. It elected members to the Legislative Assembly of Quebec.

It was created for the 1939 election from Westmount electoral district. Its final election was in 1962. It disappeared in the 1966 election and its successor electoral district was the re-created Westmount.

Members of the Legislative Assembly

References
 Election results (National Assembly)
 Election results (QuebecPolitique.com)

Former provincial electoral districts of Quebec